Haviq Rural District is a rural district (dehestan) in Haviq District, Talesh County, Gilan Province, Iran. At the 2006 census, its population was 11,201, in 2,550 families. The rural district has 29 villages.

References 

Rural Districts of Gilan Province
Talesh County